Mera Khwab is a Bollywood film. It was released in 1943. The film starred Prakash, Zebunissa, Samson, Putlibai, and Abbas. The music director was Ghulam Mohammed and the lyrics were written by M. E. Ashq.

References

External links
 

1943 films
1940s Hindi-language films
Indian black-and-white films